The Mari language is mostly written using a Cyrillic alphabet.

Cyrillic script

Meadow Mari alphabet

The Meadow Mari alphabet uses all of the letters of the Russian alphabet, plus 3 more: ҥ, ӧ, and ӱ.  Respectively, these letters represent the phonemes /ŋ/, /œ/, and /y/.

Hill Mari alphabet

The Hill Mari alphabet uses all of the letters of the Russian alphabet, plus 4 more: ӓ, ӧ, ӱ, and ӹ.  Respectively, these letters represent the phonemes /æ/, /œ/, /y/, and /ə̟/.

North-Western Mari alphabet

The North-Western Mari alphabet uses all of the letters of the Russian alphabet, plus 7 more: ӓ, ҥ, ӧ, ө, ӱ, ӫ and ӹ.  Respectively, these letters represent the phonemes /æ/, /ŋ/, /œ/, /ů/, /y/, /ẙ/ and /ə/.

Latin script

Draft version of the Latin alphabet from 1930

References

Mari language
Cyrillic-script orthographies
Cyrillic alphabets
Latin-script orthographies